The optimum is the best or most favorable condition, or the greatest amount or degree possible under specific sets of comparable circumstances.

Optimum may also refer to:

 Optimum (cable brand), a digital cable service
 Optimum Releasing, a film and DVD distribution company based in the UK

See also

 
 Optimal sorting (disambiguation)
 Optimality theory (disambiguation)
 Optimism (disambiguation)
 Optimist (disambiguation)
 Optimistic (disambiguation)
 Optimization (disambiguation), a concept in applied mathematics and engineering
 Optimum currency area, in economics and monetary policy
 Optimum programming, in computer programming
 Optimum sustainable yield, in population ecology and economics
 Thermal optimum, in geology and climate history